Minbaşı (also, Min-Bashi and Minbashy) is a village and municipality in the Sabirabad Rayon of Azerbaijan.  It has a population of 626.

References 

Populated places in Sabirabad District